John Baynham (21 April 1918 – February 1995) was a Welsh professional footballer who played as an outside forward in the Football League for Leyton Orient and Swindon Town. In July 1957, he was appointed as manager at Chesham United.

Career statistics

References 

English Football League players
Welsh footballers
Association football outside forwards
1918 births
1995 deaths
People from Ystrad
Sportspeople from Rhondda Cynon Taf
Brentford F.C. players
Leyton Orient F.C. players
Swindon Town F.C. players

Guildford City F.C. players
English football managers